Scotinotylus venetus is a species of sheet weaver found in Italy. It was described by Thorell in 1875.

References

Linyphiidae
Endemic fauna of Italy
Spiders of Europe
Spiders described in 1875